The FIS Nordic World Ski Championships 1966 took place 17–27 February 1966 in Oslo, Norway at the Holmenkollen ski arena. This was the third time the Norwegian capital hosted this event having done so in 1930 and at the 1952 Winter Olympics. This also equaled the most times a city had hosted with Lahti, Finland (1926, 1938, 1958) and Zakopane, Poland (1929, 1939, and 1962).

Men's cross-country

15 km 
20 February 1966

30 km 
17 February 1966

50 km 

26 February 1966

4 × 10 km relay
23 February 1966

Women's cross-country

5 km 
21 February 1966

10 km 
19 February 1966

3 × 5 km relay
27 February 1966

Men's Nordic combined

Individual 
21 February 1966

Men's ski jumping

Individual normal hill 

19 February 1966

Individual large hill 
27 February 1966

Medal table

References

External links

FIS 1966 Cross country results
FIS 1966 Nordic combined results
FIS 1966 Ski jumping results
Results from German Wikipedia

FIS Nordic World Ski Championships
Nordic Skiing
1966 in Nordic combined
Ski jumping competitions in Norway
1966 in Norway
February 1966 sports events in Europe
Nordic skiing competitions in Norway
1960s in Oslo
Holmenkollen